Nathan Scheelhaase (born November 8, 1990) is an American football coach and former quarterback, who is the current the offensive coordinator for the Iowa State Cyclones. He played college football at Illinois from 2010 to 2013. While playing at Rockhurst High School, he won the 2008 Missouri Gatorade Player of the Year.

High school career
Scheelhaase attended Rockhurst High School in Kansas City, Missouri. While at Rockhurst, Scheelhaase was a good student as well as a ten-time varsity letterman in football, track, and basketball. He was a four-star prospect on both Scout.com and Rivals.com. He was ranked as the seventh best dual-threat quarterback on Rivals.com. In football, Scheelhaase won the Thomas A. Simone Award, which is given to the most outstanding high school football player in the Kansas City Metropolitan area, his junior season. He was the fifth player from Rockhurst to have won the award, and the first since Brandon Shelby in 1999. Scheelhaase also was the recipient of the Missouri Gatorade Player of the Year for football his junior year. His junior year, he led Rockhurst to a 13-0 season, and a Missouri Class-6 state championship passing for 1861 yards, 20 touchdowns and only five interceptions. On the ground he also rushed 120 times for 917 yards and 14 scores. He is 6’2” weighing 190 lb., and he runs a 4.5 40-yard dash.

Recruiting

Scheelhaase committed to the University of Illinois on July 16, 2008.
Scheelhaase was recruited by the University of Oklahoma, the University of Missouri,  the University of Iowa, the University of Arkansas, and the University of Kansas among others before signing with Illinois. Scheelhaase played safety as a sophomore and said some schools had talked to him about the possibility of playing on defense, but under center is where he wanted to be. "Most everybody is recruiting me at quarterback and that's what I think I'm gonna play."

College career
Scheelhaase was redshirted his freshman year; Illinois started QBs Juice Williams and Eddie McGee.

Scheelhaase became the starting quarterback for the 2010 season. Nathan led Illinois to a 6-6 season; completing 137 passes on 241 attempts for 1,583 yards in the regular season, along with 17 touchdown passes and 8 interceptions. Scheelhaase also ran for 806 yards on 175 carries and 4 touchdowns, and was an excellent complement to Illini RB Mikel Leshoure in the running game.

In the 2010 Texas Bowl against Baylor, Scheelhaase completed 18 passes on 23 attempts for 242 yards with no interceptions. Scheelhaase had a 55-yard touchdown run late in the game, and led Illinois to its first bowl victory in more than a decade. The Fighting Illini won, 38-14.

Statistics
Scheelhaase's college stats at the completion of the 2013 season. Source:

Records
Scheelhaase holds the Illinois Fighting Illini football record for career total offensive yards with 10,634. Other records held by Scheelhaase are the third most career passing yards with 8,568, the highest season completion percentage with 66.74% (287-430), and the second most career rushing yards by a quarterback with 2,066.

Coaching career
On May 19, 2015, the University of Illinois announced it had hired Sheelhaase as Assistant Director of Football Operations. He had been offered the same position the year previous, but declined it because of a previous commitment to a youth ministry in Louisville, Kentucky. On August 29, 2015, after the firing of Scheelhaase's head coach from his playing days, Tim Beckman, Illinois offensive coordinator Bill Cubit was promoted to interim head coach, which opened up a slot on the Illinois coaching staff, and Scheelhaase was promoted to running backs coach.

Iowa State
On January 25, 2018, it was announced Scheelhaase was hired as the running backs coach under Matt Campbell at Iowa State. In 2019, he became the wide receivers coach for Iowa State. In 2021, in addition to coaching the wide receivers, he was given the additional titles of running game coordinator and running backs coach. In 2022 he was promoted to offensive coordinator.

Personal information
Scheelhaase's father, Nate Creer, started at defensive back for the University of Iowa, and started for the 1985 team that lost to UCLA in the Rose Bowl to finish 10-2, and be ranked No. 10 at the end of the season AP Poll. He was named as one of Iowa’s all-time team MVPs.

References

External links
 Illinois profile

1990 births
Living people
American football quarterbacks
Illinois Fighting Illini football players
Illinois Fighting Illini football coaches
Iowa_State_Cyclones_football_coaches